In information theory and statistics, negentropy is used as a measure of distance to normality.  The concept and phrase "negative entropy" was introduced by Erwin Schrödinger in his 1944 popular-science book What is Life? Later, Léon Brillouin shortened the phrase to negentropy. In 1974, Albert Szent-Györgyi proposed replacing the term negentropy with syntropy. That term may have originated in the 1940s with the Italian mathematician Luigi Fantappiè, who tried to construct a unified theory of biology and physics. Buckminster Fuller tried to popularize this usage, but negentropy remains common.

In a note to What is Life? Schrödinger explained his use of this phrase.

Information theory
In information theory and statistics, negentropy is used as a measure of distance to normality. Out of all distributions with a given mean and variance, the normal or Gaussian distribution is the one with the highest entropy. Negentropy measures the difference in entropy between a given distribution and the Gaussian distribution with the same mean and variance. Thus, negentropy is always nonnegative, is invariant by any linear invertible change of coordinates, and vanishes if and only if the signal is Gaussian.

Negentropy is defined as

Negentropy is used in statistics and signal processing. It is related to network entropy, which is used in independent component analysis.

In particular, it is always nonnegative.

Correlation between statistical negentropy and Gibbs' free energy

There is a physical quantity closely linked to free energy (free enthalpy), with a unit of entropy and isomorphic to negentropy known in statistics and information theory. In 1873, Willard Gibbs created a diagram illustrating the concept of free energy corresponding to free enthalpy. On the diagram one can see the quantity called capacity for entropy. This quantity is the amount of entropy that may be increased without changing an internal energy or increasing its volume. In other words, it is a difference between maximum possible, under assumed conditions, entropy and its actual entropy. It corresponds exactly to the definition of negentropy adopted in statistics and information theory. A similar physical quantity was introduced in 1869 by Massieu for the isothermal process (both quantities differs just with a figure sign) and then Planck for the isothermal-isobaric process. More recently, the Massieu–Planck thermodynamic potential, known also as free entropy, has been shown to play a great role in the so-called entropic formulation of statistical mechanics, applied among the others in molecular biology and thermodynamic non-equilibrium processes.

 

where:
 is entropy
 is negentropy (Gibbs "capacity for entropy")
 is the Massieu potential
 is the partition function
 the Boltzmann constant

In particular, mathematically the negentropy (the negative entropy function, in physics interpreted as free entropy) is the convex conjugate of LogSumExp (in physics interpreted as the free energy).

Brillouin's negentropy principle of information
In 1953, Léon Brillouin derived a general equation stating that the changing of an information bit value requires at least  energy. This is the same energy as the work Leó Szilárd's engine produces in the idealistic case. In his book, he further explored this problem concluding that any cause of this bit value change (measurement, decision about a yes/no question, erasure, display, etc.) will require the same amount of energy.

See also
 Exergy
 Free entropy
 Entropy in thermodynamics and information theory

Notes

Entropy and information
Statistical deviation and dispersion
Thermodynamic entropy